Turun Palloseura Naiset, commonly known as TPS Naiset, is a Finnish women's football team based in Turku. They represent Turun Palloseura in the Kansallinen Liiga (previously Naisten Liiga, Naisten SM-sarja), the top division of women's football in Finland. Their home ground is the upper field of the Turun Urheilupuiston (Turku Sportspark), an artificial turf pitch with seating capacity for 750 spectators.

History

TPS took part in the national championship for the first time in 1972, and won the title in 1978. After withdrawing from the top league in 1992, they returned in 2008. The 2016 campaign is team’s most successful season since returning to the top league, with TPS earning Finnish Championship silver.

Honours

Finnish Championship
  Naisten SM-sarja Champions (1): 1978
  Runners-up (8): 
 Naisten SM-sarja Runners-up (7): 1974, 1975, 1977, 1979, 1980, 1983, 1984
 Naisten Liiga Runners-up (1): 2016
  Naisten SM-sarja Third Place (2): 1976, 1985

Players

References

External links
Official website 

Women's football clubs in Finland
Association football clubs established in 1972
Sport in Turku
Women